Lee Yo-won (born April 9, 1980) is a South Korean actress. She is best known for her portrayal of Queen Seondeok in the eponymous hit period drama.

Career
Lee Yo-won was a sophomore in high school when she won a modeling contest and first appeared as a model in the November 1997 issue of fashion magazine Figaro. This led to commercials, then to minor roles in television series and movies. Though she started getting recognized by the public after the box-office success of anarchic comedy Attack the Gas Station (1999), her first notable acting role was in controversial TV drama Blue Mist (2001), where she played a young woman in her 20s who becomes romantically involved with a married man in his 40s.

Critical darling Take Care of My Cat (2001) followed shortly, for which she received several newcomer awards. In a later interview with Elle Korea in 2009, she cited the film as her most memorable work.

But after starring in a number of big-screen star vehicles that weren't received well by audiences and critics, Lee felt mentally and physically exhausted. After finishing the historical drama Daemang (lit. "The Great Ambition", 2002), she made the surprising announcement that she was temporarily retiring from the entertainment scene.

Lee made a successful acting comeback in 2005, as the lead actress in period drama Fashion 70's, which she chose because she wanted to work with TV director Lee Jae-gyu (who had previously directed Damo), and because it was not a typical love story, but depicted a woman's success in life and career. A supporting role followed in romantic comedy When Romance Meets Destiny.

In 2007, Lee played the titular character in hit medical drama/romance Surgeon Bong Dal-hee, though her next series, melodrama Bad Love was less successful in the ratings. She then switched to more serious fare as part of the ensemble cast of May 18, a film about the Gwangju massacre and one of the highest grossing Korean films of all time.

Tired of playing fragile characters, Lee portrayed Queen Seondeok of Silla in the massively popular period drama Queen Seondeok (2009). Her follow-up, fantasy melodrama 49 Days (2011) in which she played dual roles as a woman possessed, also resonated with audiences. Afterwards she appeared in Horse Doctor (2012) about a Joseon-era veterinarian turned royal physician, and Empire of Gold (2013) which revolved around a power struggle over a chaebol.

On the big screen, Lee said after her enjoyable experience working with Jeong Jae-eun on Take Care of My Cat, she wanted to work with other female directors, so she starred in Anna Lee's romantic mystery The Recipe (2010) and Bang Eun-jin's crime thriller Perfect Number (2012). In contrast, she was cast in the only female starring role in Kang Woo-suk's Fists of Legend (2013), about middle-aged men who join a televised mixed martial arts tournament/reality show.

In 2016, Lee made a successful comeback to the small screen with the quirky romantic-comedy My Horrible Boss. Her role as a hot-headed career woman was well-received, with many citing it as her "rediscovery role". She then participated in another film, titled Yes, Family, playing a reporter who is the oldest among-st four siblings. Lee also starred in the MBC drama Night Light, alongside Jin Goo and Uee.

In 2017, Lee starred in the black comedy series Avengers Social Club.

In 2019, Lee starred in the espionage melodrama Different Dreams and  The Running Mates: Human Rights.

Personal life
Lee married businessman and professional golfer Park Jin-woo on January 10, 2003. The couple have two daughters & one son (born in Dec 2003, May 2014 and May 2015).

Filmography

Film

Television series

Variety

Music video

Discography

Awards and nominations

Listicles

References

External links

 
 
 
 

South Korean film actresses
South Korean television actresses
South Korean female models
South Korean Roman Catholics
Dankook University alumni
1980 births
Living people